Mississippi Highway 354 (MS 354) is a short  east–west state highway in Tippah County, Mississippi. Lying in the northern part of the county, it connects the town of Walnut with the community of Chalybeate.

Route description
It heads east along Commerce Street to pass directly through downtown before crossing some abandoned railroad tracks to travel through neighborhoods. The highway leaves Walnut and heads southeast through farmland, where it crosses Muddy Creek, before winding its way through some wooded hills as it enters the community of Chalybeate. MS 354 passes directly through the center of the community, passing by the school and many old storefronts, before state maintenance (and the MS 354 designation) comes to an end at the intersection with County Road 203 (CR 203); the roadway continues east as CR 218 (Old Highway 72).

The entire length of MS 354 is a rural, two-lane, state highway, located entirely in Tippah County.

Major intersections

References

External links

354
Transportation in Tippah County, Mississippi